Sun Java System was a brand used by Sun Microsystems to market computer software. The Sun Java System brand superseded the Sun ONE brand in September 2003.  There are two major suites under this brand, the Sun Java Enterprise System suite of infrastructure software, and the Sun Java Desktop System graphical user environment.

Sun ONE brand

Sun ONE was a brand under which Sun Microsystems marketed server software products from 2002 to 2003. Sun ONE stood for Sun Open Net Environment.

The Sun ONE brand was primarily used for products that resulted after the dissolution of Sun's alliance with Netscape Communications Corporation, which was sold under the brand name of iPlanet. The name was also applied to other Sun software products such as Sun ONE Studio 8 and Sun ONE Active Server Pages 4.0. Products included:
Sun ONE Web Server
Sun ONE Web Proxy Server
Sun ONE Application Server
Sun ONE Messaging Server
Sun ONE Calendar Server
Sun ONE Directory Server

Sun ONE was introduced on April 15, 2002, to supersede the iPlanet brand name, following the end of the Sun-Netscape alliance. Sun ONE itself was superseded on September 16, 2003 by the Sun Java System brand.

Sun Java Enterprise System
The Sun Java Enterprise System is itself broken into smaller suites, which include:

Identity management services (Sun Java Identity Management Suite)
 Sun Java System Access Manager
 Sun Java System Identity Manager
 Sun Java System Role Manager
 Sun Java System Federation Manager
 Sun Java System Directory Server, formerly Sun ONE Directory Server and iPlanet Directory Server
 Sun Java System Directory Proxy Server

Business Integration - SOA (Sun Java Composite Application Platform Suite) 
 Sun Java ESB Suite
 Sun Java B2B Suite

Web and application services 
 Sun Java System Application Server (SJSAS), formerly Sun ONE Application Server
 Sun Java System Message Queue (SJSMQ), formerly Java Message Queue
 Sun Java System Web Server, formerly Sun ONE Web Server and iPlanet Web Server
 Sun Java System Web Proxy Server, formerly Sun ONE Web Proxy Server and iPlanet Web Proxy Server
 Sun Java System Messaging Server, formerly Sun ONE Messaging Server and iPlanet Messaging Server
 Sun Java System Calendar Server, formerly Sun ONE Calendar Server and iPlanet Calendar Server
 Sun Java System Service Registry

Portal services 
 Sun Java System Portal Server
 Sun Java System Portal Mobile Access
 Sun Java System Portal Remote Access

Availability services (Sun Java Availability Suite) 
 Sun Cluster
 Sun Cluster Agents
 Sun Cluster Geographic Edition
 Sun N1 Service Provisioning System

Development tools 
 Java Studio Enterprise
 Java Studio Creator

Sun Java Desktop System

References

External links
 Sun Java System Wiki
 Java ES Interoperability Space

Sun Microsystems software